Ottawa Fury Football Club was a Canadian professional soccer club based in Ottawa, Ontario. The club competed in the North American Soccer League and USL Championship and played its home games at TD Place Stadium.

The Ottawa Fury FC were dissolved as a soccer club on November 8, 2019 and their USL franchise rights were sold to Miami FC on December 11, 2019. An unrelated club, Atlético Ottawa, were formed in 2020 to enter the Canadian Premier League representing the city, with home games again at TD Place Stadium.

History

Formative years 
On June 20, 2011, the North American Soccer League announced that Ottawa had been awarded an expansion franchise. The team would join the league in 2014 once developments at Lansdowne Park were completed. In February 2013, the club ran a campaign to select a name and received over 4,000 submissions. Club president John Pugh announced that Ottawa Fury FC was chosen as the name.

On May 23, 2013, the club named Marc Dos Santos as the first head coach. Two days later, the official crest was revealed at an event open to season ticket holders and supporters groups. In the final months leading up to the 2014 season, the club also named Martin Nash as assistant coach, David Bellemare as goalkeeping coach and Philip Dos Santos as technical director.

North American Soccer League (2014–2016) 
With Lansdowne Park not ready for the 2014 spring season, the club agreed a short-term deal to play at Keith Harris Stadium. After going unbeaten in five pre-season friendlies, Ottawa Fury lost 2–0 at the Fort Lauderdale Strikers in their first competitive match on April 12, 2014. The club finished the spring season in sixth with three wins from nine games. Ottawa Fury moved into Lansdowne Park ahead of the fall season, and lost 1–0 to the New York Cosmos in their first match at the new stadium on July 20. After failing to record a win in their first six matches of the 2014 fall season, the club finished in eighth place.

Ottawa Fury added Chelsea academy coach Darko Buser to the club's management team for the 2015 season, and after another unbeaten pre-season in 2015, ended the 2015 spring season in ninth place. The club saw great improvement for the 2015 fall season, and were crowned champions with 45 points from 20 games and sitting six points clear of Minnesota United. Ottawa beat Minnesota in extra time with a 2–1 victory in the Soccer Bowl semi-final, but lost 3–2 to the New York Cosmos in the final a week later.

In November 2015, Marc Dos Santos stepped down as head coach to join Sporting Kansas City as assistant coach having announced his intentions to the club two months earlier. On November 20, the club named Paul Dalglish as his replacement. The following month, Philip Dos Santos left his position as technical director and was replaced by Buser. A third consecutive unbeaten pre-season campaign followed, but the club could only manage a ninth-place finish in the 2016 spring season with nine points from a possible 30. Ottawa Fury finished the 2016 fall season bottom of the table amidst rumours the club would leave the North American Soccer League.

USL Championship (2017–2019) 
On October 25, 2016, the club announced that they would join the United Soccer League for the 2017 season. At the time of the announcement, it had been reported that the Fury were losing up to $2 million per year while operating in the North American Soccer League.

In December 2016, the Montreal Impact announced an affiliation agreement with Ottawa Fury after disbanding their reserve side FC Montreal. The club remained eligible for the Canadian Championship.

On August 14, 2017, Dalglish left his role at Ottawa Fury. Club president John Pugh announced that Dalglish had informed him of his intention to leave the club for personal reasons, and two days later the club and Dalglish decided to mutually part ways. Former player and current assistant coach Julian de Guzman took over as interim head coach for the remainder of the season. The Fury ended their first United Soccer League campaign in 10th place, missing out on the Conference Playoffs by six points.

On December 21, 2017, the club announced that Nikola Popović would take over as their new head coach. De Guzman remained with the club as general manager.

On September 5, 2018, Mark Goudie, president and CEO of Ottawa Sports and Entertainment Group, officially dispelled rumours about the club joining the Canadian Premier League (CPL) for the league's first season in 2019, citing the stability of the USL as their reason to remain there. Goudie, however, stated that the club supports the CPL's mission of expanding soccer in Canada, and did not rule out joining it in the future. On December 12, 2018, the Canadian Soccer Association (CSA) received a letter from CONCACAF, stating that the Ottawa Fury's sanctioning to play in the 2019 USL Championship season would be revoked, despite the club receiving approval from both the CSA and the United States Soccer Federation (USSF). On December 13, 2018, CONCACAF released a statement saying that they "never received a formal request from any party to consider sanctioning the participation of the Ottawa Fury in the 2019 season of the USL, despite public announcements by Ottawa Fury that it would be doing so". CONCACAF additionally stated that the launch of the CPL precludes the "exceptional circumstances" provision which allowed Canadian clubs to participate in USSF-sanctioned leagues. On December 19, 2018, OSEG filed for arbitration with the Court of Arbitration for Sport in an attempt to reinstate the Fury's sanctioning in the USL. Two days later, the club revealed that it would be allowed to continue to play in the USL for the 2019 season.

In the 2019 season, the Fury reached the play-offs for the first time since joining the USL. Their play-off run, however, only lasted one game as they were knocked out in the play-in round by the Charleston Battery, who advanced on penalties. One week later, on October 30, the Fury announced they would not be renewing the contract of head coach Nikola Popović.

On November 8, 2019 the Fury announced that they had not been sanctioned to play in the USL Championship for the 2020 season and would be suspending operations. The team had received sanctioning from Canada Soccer, but not from the USSF and  CONCACAF. On December 11, the Fury announced the sale of its franchise rights to the ownership group of Miami FC, with Miami set to participate in the 2020 USL Championship season.

Stadium

 Keith Harris Stadium; Ottawa, Ontario (2014)
 TD Place Stadium; Ottawa, Ontario (2014–2019)

In order to join the North American Soccer League, Ottawa Fury planned to compete at Lansdowne Park for the 2014 season. After delays in the stadium developments, the club reached an agreement with Carleton University to play five games at Keith Harris Stadium on the university campus until construction was completed. In July 2014, the Fury moved into their new stadium in time for the 2014 fall season. The stadium is also known as TD Place Stadium due to sponsorship reasons. The club share the stadium with the Ottawa Redblacks, a Canadian Football League team, and the two teams played their opening games on the same weekend.

The stadium was one of six chosen to host matches for the 2015 FIFA Women's World Cup, and hosted a total of nine matches from the group stages to the quarter finals.

Crest and colours

On May 25, 2013, the club's official crest was revealed at an event open to season ticket holders and supporters groups. The crest was a traditional soccer shield design that included the club's name and a flame used as a symbol of the club. The official club colours are red, black and white.

In late 2013, over 1,500 supporters took part in a campaign to help pick one of three designs to become the club's first kits. They were unveiled ahead of the inaugural North American Soccer League season in March 2014. Both the primary and secondary kit featured the traditional colours of Ottawa sport.

Club culture

Supporters 
The Bytown Boys Supporters Club was formed in April 2011 in response to news of an expansion Canadian Soccer League franchise being awarded to Ottawa. Originally known as the Capital City Supporters Group, the club showed support for Capital City until they announced they would no longer compete in the league in March 2012. The following month, it was announced that the group had reached an agreement with the Ottawa Fury, a Premier Development League club who would become a North American Soccer League expansion team in the near future. In 2013, the Bytown Boys also showed support for the Ottawa Fury Women in the USL W-League. The group continued to support Ottawa Fury as they joined the North American Soccer League in 2014, and the United Soccer League three years later.

In August 2013, the Stony Monday Riot was formed in preparation for the club's inaugural season in the North American Soccer League. The group try to bring together supporters of all backgrounds to experience full participation in every match. As well as Ottawa Fury, the Stony Monday Riot show support for soccer at all levels in the National Capital Region.

Mascot 
Sparky, Ottawa Fury's mascot, is based on the flame symbol introduced in the club's original crest design. Big Joe, the mascot of the Ottawa Redblacks, and Riley, the mascot of the Ottawa 67's, have also made appearances at the club with all three teams part of the Ottawa Sports and Entertainment Group.

Rivalries 
During their time in the North American Soccer League, Ottawa Fury's main rivalry was with FC Edmonton, the only other Canadian team competing in the league when they joined in 2014. The meetings between the two sides were named "The Battle of Canada" and occurred in both the league and the Canadian Championship. The two teams met every year in the preliminary round over two legs, with the first ever meeting ending in a goalless draw on April 23, 2014. A week later, the Fury suffered a 3–1 defeat to FC Edmonton with Vini Dantas scoring Ottawa's only goal. On May 31, Ottawa Fury beat FC Edmonton 1–0 in the first league meeting between the two sides with Tom Heinemann scoring a last minute goal.

Players and staff

Staff

Head coaches

Record includes league, playoff, and Canadian Championship games.

Broadcasting 
During the club's inaugural season in the North American Soccer League, all home matches were televised on Rogers TV Ottawa. Home and away matches were broadcast on the radio in English on TSN 1200, and select home matches were broadcast in French on 94,5 Unique FM.

All matches were broadcast on Rogers TV for the 2017 season, and the USL Match Centre provided coverage for all league matches. Radio broadcasts included every game in English, and all home games in French. The following season, it was announced that every home game would be streamed online on Fury TV and all league matches would remain available on the USL Match Centre. All home matches were broadcast on radio in both English and French.

Honours

North American Soccer League 
 Fall Championship
 Champions: 2015
 Soccer Bowl
 Runners-Up: 2015
 North American Supporters' Trophy
 Runners-Up: 2015
 Fair Play Award
 Winners: 2015

Record

Year-by-year

Note: Only league goals counted for top scorer

Top goalscorers

Most appearances

Individual awards

North American Soccer League

References

External links
Official website

 
2011 establishments in Ontario
Association football clubs established in 2011
2019 disestablishments in Ontario
Association football clubs disestablished in 2019
Former USL Championship teams
Soccer clubs in Ottawa
Expatriated football clubs
North American Soccer League teams
United Soccer League teams based in Canada